The Beisel-Mitchell House is a historic house at 420 West Court Street in Paragould, Arkansas.  It is a two-story L-shaped Spanish Revival structure with a white stucco exterior, and a low-pitch gable roof clad in red tile.  The house was built in 1930 for E. N. Beisel as a wedding present for his wife, and apparently kicked off a minor building boom of similar Spanish Revival houses in the area.  It is among the best-preserved and least-altered of those houses.

The house was listed on the National Register of Historic Places in 1996.

See also
National Register of Historic Places listings in Greene County, Arkansas

References

Houses on the National Register of Historic Places in Arkansas
Mission Revival architecture in Arkansas
Houses completed in 1930
Houses in Greene County, Arkansas
National Register of Historic Places in Greene County, Arkansas
Buildings and structures in Paragould, Arkansas